Lee Hewitt (born August 29, 1960) is an American politician. He is a member of the South Carolina House of Representatives from the 108th District, serving since 2018. He is a member of the Republican party.

Electoral history

References

Living people
1960 births
Republican Party members of the South Carolina House of Representatives
21st-century American politicians
Coastal Carolina University alumni
People from Marion, South Carolina